Rigor Sardonicous is an American doom metal band from Long Island, New York. Coined as "raw, apocalyptic doom", Rigor Sardonicous is one of the earliest American doom metal bands that are still active today among Novembers Doom and Evoken. The band members are committed to unearthing the darkest, deepest funeral doom sounds imaginable since coming together in 1988.
According to an interview, the band is influenced by slow parts of death metal bands like Obituary, Winter and Autopsy.

The band's name is Latin for "Rigid and sardonic"; the vast majority of their album and song titles are in Latin. However, the lyrics are still in English. On most of their recordings, the band uses a Boss DR-660 Dr. Rhythm drum machine.

History 
Rigor Sardonicous was formed in 1988 by bassist Glenn Hampton, before guitarist-vocalist Joseph J. Fogarazzo joined him in 1990. The band's debut album Apocalypsis Damnare was released in 1999, followed by a split album with The Forgotten in 2002 and then their second album Principia Sardonica in 2004.

In 2005, Apocalypsis Damnare was re-recorded and re-released via Paragon Records, while their demo, Risus Ex Mortuus, was re-recorded and re-released as a full-length album in 2006 by the Russian label Endless Desperation Records. In 2008, the band released its third album Vallis Ex Umbra De Mortuus, followed in 2012 by their fourth album Ego Diligio Vos. In 2011, a live album titled Vivescere Exitium was released on cassette format and was limited to 200 copies. The recordings came from a New York concert on August 14, 2009. The concert had also been available as a free download even since.

Members

Current members 
Glenn Hampton – bass (1988–present)
Joseph J. Fogarazzo – guitar, vocals (1990–present)

Past members 
Ryan Böhlmann – drums (session only)
Gabe Madsen – drums (1988–1991)
Steve Moran – bass (2004–2005)

Discography

Studio albums 
 Apocalypsis Damnare (CD, 1999, self-released, re-released by Paragon Records, 2005)
 Principia Sardonica (CD, 2004, Paragon Records)
 Vallis Ex Umbra De Mortuus (CD, LP, 2008, Paragon Records)
 Ego Diligio Vos (CD, 2012)
 Praeparet Bellum (CD, 2023)

Demos 
 Risus Ex Mortuus (cassette, 1994, self-released, re-released on CD by Endless Desperation, 2006)

Live albums 
 Vivescere Exitium (live recording; free digital download off main website, Distoare Music, 2011)

EPs and splits 
 The Forgotten / Rigor Sardonicous (7" split with The Forgotten, Paragon Records, 2002)
 Amores Defunctus Tuus Mater (CD split w/Dimentianon, Largactyl Records, 2007)
 I / Neo-pesaimism (7" split with Persistence in Mourning, Feudal Throne Records, 2010)
 Ridenti Mortis (digital EP, self-released, 2018)

References

External links 
 Official website
 
  Official Rigor Sardonicous forum
 
 Rigor Sardonicous at LastFM

American doom metal musical groups
Musical groups established in 1988
Heavy metal musical groups from New York (state)
Funeral doom musical groups